Steve Hamer is a former chairman of both Swansea City and Bristol Rovers football clubs. He held the position at Bristol Rovers from February 2016 until November 2019, having previously been chairman of Swansea from 1997 to 2000.

Football career
He played as a central defender in non-League football making his Isthmian League debut aged 18 against Clapton in 1970 for the Corinthian-Casuals. He left the Corinthian-Casuals in February 1971 and joined local rivals Tooting & Mitcham United. In 1972 Manager Sid Cann signed him for Sutton United. A serious knee injury kept him out of the game for most of that season before he rejoined former Tooting and Mitcham manager Doug Flack at Carshalton Athletic, where he was a teammate of future England national football team Manager Roy Hodgson.

In 1975, he left Carshalton Athletic and signed as a full-time professional for Berea Park based in Pretoria and playing in the National Football League. In the early part of 1976 due to personal reasons he returned to the UK and signed for Bromley At the start of the 1976–77 season he became player/manager of the Corinthian-Casuals alongside Paul Sussams. In 1977 Sussams became the sole manager.

In 1978 due to a serious knee injury he was forced to retire from the game as a player. In 1981, he joined London Weekend Television's Big Match programme working alongside Brian Moore for over 10 years, continuing to do so, even after acquiring the National Sporting Club from Lord Forte in 1987 which was based in the Cafe Royal, Piccadilly, London W1  with former Corinthian-Casuals goalkeeping teammate, past England cricket Captain Bob Willis.

He became chairman of Swansea City in 1997, but was sacked in September 2000 after expressing concerns about the club's flotation on the Alternative Investment Market, and its misrepresentation of the offer to the club's supporters. He was later vindicated by the demise of Silver Shield the Plc that owned the Club at the time who handed the Club over for £1 to its commercial manager who in turn passed the Club over some months later when destitute to Tony Petty.

In 2002, he sold his interest in the National Sporting Club and worked as a consultant in football club brokerage alongside Keith Harris until his appointment as Chairman of Bristol Rovers in February 2016.

References

Living people
1951 births
Welsh footballers
Association football defenders
Corinthian-Casuals F.C. players
Tooting & Mitcham United F.C. players
Sutton United F.C. players
Carshalton Athletic F.C. players
Berea Park F.C. players
Bromley F.C. players
Welsh football managers
Corinthian-Casuals F.C. managers
Swansea City A.F.C.
Bristol Rovers F.C. chairmen and investors